De Bonis or De bonis may refer to:

 Francesco De Bonis (b. 1982), an Italian road bicycle racer
 De bonis non administratis, a legal term for assets remaining in an estate after the death or removal of the estate administrator

 See also

 Bonis
 List of Latin phrases